Ghazipur is a city and municipal corporation in the state of Uttar Pradesh, India.

Ghazipur may also refer to:

 Ghazipur (Lok Sabha constituency), Uttar Pradesh, India
 Ghazipur district, Uttar Pradesh, India
Gazipur (Delhi), a village in Delhi, India

See also

 Gazipur (disambiguation)